Bay Path Regional Vocational Technical High School is a secondary school located in Charlton, Massachusetts, United States and sits on top of Old Mugget Hill. The school serves about 1,100 students grades 9 to 12 and some Post-Grad students as well.

General
Bay Path first opened in 1972. Its students come from the surrounding towns of Auburn, Charlton, Dudley, N. Brookfield, Oxford, Paxton, Rutland, Spencer, Southbridge, and Webster.

Bay Path is a vocational school with 23 different shops for students to choose from: Advanced Manufacturing; Auto Collision, Repair and Refinishing; Automotive Technology; Business Technology; Cabinetry; Carpentry; Cosmetology; Culinary Arts, Dental Assisting; Drafting; Electrical; Electronics; Facilities Management; Graphic Communications; Health Technologies; Heating, Ventilation, Air conditioning, Refrigeration; Information Support Services and Networking; Marketing; Masonry and Tile Setting; Metal Fabrication and Joining Technologies, Plumbing; Programming and Web Development; Veterinary Science.

Bay Path has an evening school program simply named Bay Path Adult Evening School which is in session for two semesters (fall and spring) with over 175 courses, shows, and tours to choose from.

Groups
Bay Path's students can also join many different school groups. These include Renaissance, National Honor Society, Year Book Committee, Student Council, S.A.D.D (Students Against Destructive Decisions), Skills USA, Robotics, Math Team, Gay Straight Alliance, Ski Club, Student Government Day, Bowling club, Cornhole club, Board Game club, Chorus and Drama/Theatre club.

Achievements
Aside from the numerous sports titles, like the 2008 and 2011 State Vocational Football Championship, Bay Path also has been noted for its academic achievements, including:
 2007 Compass School die for its remarkable MCAS scores over the past years.
 Bay Path's Culinary Department has also won the Southern Worcester, Massachusetts chowder fest.
 Bay Path has placed many students in Skills USA and many have won Gold, Silver, and Bronze in states and in National.

References

External links

Educational institutions established in 1972
Schools in Worcester County, Massachusetts
Public high schools in Massachusetts
1972 establishments in Massachusetts